Al-Janubiyah or Al Janobiyah (from Arabic الجنوبية, 'southern') and Al Janub ('south'), or variants may refer to:

Places
Southern Governorate, Bahrain, or Al Janubiyah
South Governorate, Lebanon (Al Janūb Governorate)
Southern Provinces (Al-Aqalim al-Janubiyah) or "Moroccan Sahara"

Other uses
Jānubi, Jānubi Yamani, Jānubi Soudani, etc. – rhythmic units in Arabic music
Wail al-Shehri (1973–2001) aka Abu Mossaeb al-Janubi, September 11, 2001 airplane hijacker

See also
Al Gharbiyah (disambiguation) (western)
Ash Shamaliyah (disambiguation) (northern)
Ash Sharqiyah (disambiguation) (eastern)
Al Wusta (disambiguation) (central)
Southern (disambiguation)
Dhofar Governorate in Southern Oman